No. 7 Squadron of the Royal Air Force operates the Boeing Chinook HC6 from RAF Odiham, Hampshire.

History

Formation and early years
No. 7 Squadron was formed at Farnborough Airfield on 1 May 1914 as the last squadron of the Royal Flying Corps (RFC) to be formed before the First World War, but has been disbanded and reformed several times since, the first being after only three months of existence, the latter as early as 28 September 1914. The squadron spent most of the First World War in observation and interception roles and was responsible for the first ever interception of an enemy aircraft over Britain.

No 7 Squadron deployed to France in April 1915, flying Royal Aircraft Factory R.E.5s for reconnaissance and Vickers Gunbuses as escort fighters. Captain John Aidan Liddell of 7 Squadron won the Victoria Cross for his actions on 31 July 1915, when he continued his reconnaissance mission over Belgium after the aircraft was hit by ground fire, the aircraft being badly damaged and Liddell suffering a broken thigh. Although he successfully recovered the R.E.5 to allied lines, saving his observer, he died of his wounds a month later.

The squadron re-equipped with B.E.2s in 1916, which it used for both bombing and reconnaissance during the Battle of the Somme that year. The B.E.2s were replaced by R.E.8s in July 1917, continuing in the reconnaissance role for the rest of the war, operating in Ypres during the Battle of Passchendaele in the summer and autumn of 1917 and in support of Belgium forces in the closing months of the war. It disbanded at the end of 1919.

To Bomber Command
It re-formed at RAF Bircham Newton on 1 June 1923 with the Vickers Vimy as a night heavy bomber squadron, continuing in this role with a succession of types through the inter-war period.  It started to receive the Vickers Virginia bomber on 22 May 1924, being the first RAF Squadron to operate Virginias, although it did not dispose of the last of its Vimys until April 1927. In 1927 it moved to RAF Worthy Down, commanded by Charles Portal, later to become Chief of the Air Staff during the Second World War. In 1932, Frederick Higginson, who became a fighter ace in the Second World War, was assigned as a mechanic-gunner to the squadron.

The squadron gained a reputation as being one of the leading RAF heavy bomber squadrons, winning the Lawrence Minot Memorial Bombing Trophy six times between 1927 and 1933 and shared in 1934 with 54 Squadron, achieving an average bombing error of 40 yards (37 m). By this time, the elderly Virginia was obsolete and in April 1935 they were replaced by the more modern Handley Page Heyford, with which the squadron won the Lawrence Minot trophy yet again in 1935. Part of the squadron was split off in October 1935 to form No. 102 Squadron, while the remainder moved to RAF Finningley in September 1936. In April 1937 the squadron received four Vickers Wellesleys to equip a flight which was again split off to form 76 Squadron.

In March 1938 it replaced its Heyford biplanes with monoplanes from Armstrong Whitworth Whitley . It re-equipped again in April 1939, with Handley Page Hampden bombers replacing the Whitleys. In June 1939 it became a training unit, preparing crews for the Hampden equipped 5 Group.

Second World War

On the outbreak of the Second World War, it continued to be used for training bomber crews, disbanding on 4 April 1940 when it merged with 76 Squadron to form No. 16 OTU. On 1 August 1940 it reformed, becoming the first squadron to equip with the new Short Stirling heavy bomber, the first RAF squadron to operate four engined bombers during the Second World War, flying the first bombing raids with the Stirling against oil storage tanks near Rotterdam on the night of 10/11 February 1941. It flew on the 1000 bomber raids to Cologne, Essen and Bremen in May and June 1942. It was transferred to the Pathfinder Force in August 1942, with the job of finding and marking targets for the Main Force of Bomber Command bombers.

The squadron re-equipped with the Avro Lancaster from 11 May 1943, flying its first mission with the Lancaster on 12 July 1943. It continued in the Pathfinder role until the end of the war in Europe. It flew its last bomber mission on 25 April 1945 against Wangerooge, and dropped food to starving civilians in the Netherlands in May. While it was planned to fly 7 Squadron out to the Far East to join Tiger Force for air attacks against Japan, the war ended before the squadron was due to move. The squadron carried out 5,060 operational sorties with the loss of 165 aircraft.

Post-war
After World War II it was equipped with Avro Lincoln bombers, an update of the Lancaster. Based at RAF Upwood, the Lincoln was for several years the front line cold war bomber aircraft. It was used in the Malayan emergency, the Middle East, the Trucial States (the Emirates) and then Aden. The squadron disbanded on 2 January 1956 before reforming with the Vickers Valiant at RAF Honington in Suffolk in December that year, flying them in the Strategic Bomber role until disbanding in 1962. 7 Squadron was eventually reformed in 1970, this time as a target squadron flying the English Electric Canberra until January 1982.

The squadron reformed in the Support Helicopter role, receiving Chinooks HC.1s in September 1982. The Chinook HC.2, equivalent to the US Army CH-47D standard, began to enter RAF service in 1993. Following the Iraqi invasion of Kuwait, 7 Squadron took part in the UK's deployment to the Gulf in 1991.

On 2 June 1994, a 7 Squadron Chinook HC.2 (ZD576) crashed into the Mull of Kintyre while carrying 25 senior members of the British security forces from RAF Aldergrove, Belfast to Inverness. All passengers and the four crew were killed. In April 2001, 7 Squadron RAF became part of the Joint Special Forces Aviation Wing (JSFAW) with a role to support the United Kingdom Special Forces. On 19 August 2009, a Chinook made an emergency landing in Afghanistan after being hit by a rocket-propelled grenade (RPG).

In March 2020, the squadron was awarded the right to emblazon battle honours on its squadron standard, recognising its role in the British military intervention in Sierra Leone in 2000 and the War in Afghanistan between 2001 and 2014.

Aircraft operated
Aircraft operated include:

See also
 List of Royal Air Force aircraft squadrons

References

Notes

Bibliography

 Ashworth, Chris. Encyclopedia of Modern Royal Air Force Squadrons. Wellingborough, UK:PSL, 1989. .
 Bowyer, Michael J.F. The Stirling Story. Manchester: Crécy Publishing, 2002. .
 Docherty, Tom. Bomber Squadron No.7, The World War 2 Record. Pen & Sword Aviation, 2007. .
 J Falconer, Bomber Command Handbook 1939–1945, 2003, Sutton Publishing, Stroud, England, .
 Halley, James J. The Squadrons of the Royal Air Force. Tonbridge, Kent, UK: Air Britain (Historians), 1980. .
 Halley, James J. The Squadrons of the Royal Air Force & Commonwealth, 1918–1988. Tonbridge, Kent, UK: Air-Britain (Historians) Ltd., 1988. .
 Jefford, Wing Commander C.G. RAF Squadrons, a Comprehensive Record of the Movement and Equipment of all RAF Squadrons and their Antecedents since 1912. Shrewsbury: Airlife Publishing, 2001. .
 Lewis, Peter. Squadron Histories: R.F.C, R.N.A.S and R.A.F., 1912–59. London: Putnam, 1959.
 Moyes, Philip J.R. Bomber Squadrons of the RAF and their Aircraft. London: Macdonald and Jane's (Publishers) Ltd., 1964 (new edition 1976). .
 Rawlings, John D.R. Coastal, Support and Special Squadrons of the RAF and their Aircraft. London: Jane's Publishing Company Ltd., 1982. .
 Thetford, Owen. "By Day and By Night: Part Seven: Vickers Vimy Service History". Aeroplane Monthly, December 1992. London:IPC. ISSN 0143-7240. pp. 30–38.
 Thetford, Owen. "By Day and By Night: Ginnies in Service :Part 1". Aeroplane Monthly, June 1993. London:IPC. ISSN 0143-7240. pp. 32–39.
 Ward, Chris. Royal Air Force Bomber Command Squadron Profiles no. 1: 7 Squadron (Per Diem Per Noctem). Published by the author, no ISBN.
 West, Flt Lt R.J. Nothing Heard After Take-off: A Short History of No. 7 Squadron Royal Air Force, 1914–1974. St Mawgan, Newquay, Cornwall, UK: The Lithoprint Company, 1974.
 Yoxall, John. "No. 7 Squadron: The History of a Famous Bomber Squadron: Part I".Flight, 18 May 1951. Vol LIX, No. 2208. pp. 589–593.
 Yoxall, John "No. 7 Squadron: The History of a Famous Bomber Squadron: Part II". Flight, 25 May 1951. Vol. LIX, No. 2209. pp. 620–624.

Further reading

External links

 RAF – 7 Squadron
 Traces of World War 2: Royal Air Force – No. 7 Squadron
 Air of Authority – A History of RAF Organisation: The history of squadrons 6 till 10 RAF
 7 Squadron association

Military units and formations established in 1914
007 squadron
007 squadron
1914 establishments in the United Kingdom
Special forces of the United Kingdom